Red Mountain is located in the Lewis Range, Glacier National Park in the U.S. state of Montana.

Climate
Based on the Köppen climate classification, it is located in an alpine subarctic climate zone with long, cold, snowy winters, and cool to warm summers. Winter temperatures can drop below −10 °F with wind chill factors below −30 °F.

Geology

Like other mountains in Glacier National Park, it is composed of sedimentary rock laid down during the Precambrian to Jurassic periods.

See also
 List of mountains and mountain ranges of Glacier National Park (U.S.)

References

Red
Red
Lewis Range
Mountains of Montana